Lahanda may refer to:
 Lahnda, a language group of Western Punjab, Pakistan
 Lahanda, Bargarh, a village in Bargarh district, Odisha, India
 Lahanda, Kendujhar, a village in Kendujhar district, Odisha, India
 Lahanda, Sundargarh, a village in Sundargarh district, Odisha, India
 Lahanda, Uttar Dinajpur, a village in Uttar Dinajpur district, West Bengal, India